Robert Hunter Biden (born February 4, 1970) is an American attorney, businessman and artist who is the second son of U.S. President Joe Biden and his first wife Neilia Hunter Biden. He is also a hedge fund, venture capital, and private-equity fund investor who formerly worked as a lobbyist, banker, public administration official, and registered lobbyist-firm attorney. Biden was a founding board member of BHR Partners, a Chinese investment company. In 2020, he began exhibiting his paintings.

Biden was discharged from the U.S. Navy Reserve shortly after his commissioning due to a failed drug test. Since late 2018, Hunter Biden's tax affairs have been under federal criminal investigation.

Biden served on the board of Burisma Holdings, one of the largest private natural gas producers in Ukraine, from 2014 until his term expired in April 2019. Since the early months of 2019, he and his father Joe Biden have been the subjects of unsupported claims of corrupt activities in a Biden–Ukraine conspiracy theory pushed by then–U.S. President Donald Trump and his allies, concerning Hunter Biden's business dealings in Ukraine and Joe Biden's anti-corruption efforts there. 

In October 2020, the New York Post published an article about a laptop computer that previously belonged to Hunter Biden. The laptop contained around 129,000 emails and other materials, but the Post provided no evidence as to the chain of custody or authenticity of the device. Other media outlets declined to publish the story due to that lack of provenance. 

In March 2022, The New York Times and The Washington Post reported that some of the emails found on the device were authentic. Some of the Bidens' detractors have claimed that the laptop contents exposed corruption by Hunter's father, President Joe Biden, but no evidence of criminal wrongdoing by Joe Biden has surfaced to date.

Early life

Robert Hunter Biden was born on February 4, 1970, in Wilmington, Delaware. He is the second son of Neilia Biden (née Hunter) and Joe Biden. Hunter Biden's mother and younger sister Naomi were killed in an automobile crash on December 18, 1972. Biden and his older brother Beau were also seriously injured but survived. Beau suffered multiple broken bones while Hunter sustained a fractured skull and severe traumatic brain injuries. Both spent several months in the hospital, when their father was sworn into the U.S. Senate in January 1973. Hunter and Beau later encouraged their father to marry again, and Jill Jacobs became their stepmother in 1977. Biden's half-sister Ashley was born in 1981.

Like his father and brother, Biden attended Catholic high school Archmere Academy in Claymont, Delaware. He graduated with a Bachelor of Arts degree in history from Georgetown University in 1992. During the year after he graduated from college, he served as a Jesuit volunteer at a church in Portland, Oregon, and met Kathleen Buhle, whom he married in 1993. After attending Georgetown University Law Center for one year, he transferred to Yale Law School and graduated in 1996.

Early career

After graduating from law school in 1996, Biden accepted a consultant position at the bank holding company MBNA, whose employees donated more than $200,000 into Joe Biden's senate campaigns. MBNA's hiring of Biden was controversial because his father had pushed for credit card legislation which was beneficial to the credit card industry and was supported by MBNA during Biden's time at the bank. The legislation made it more difficult to get bankruptcy protection. This led to Byron York of National Review referring to Joe Biden, years later, as "the senator from MBNA" referencing the close relationship between the two. By 1998, Hunter Biden had risen to the rank of executive vice president at MBNA. Biden departed from MBNA in 1998. He then served at the United States Department of Commerce, focusing on ecommerce policy for President Bill Clinton's administration. Biden then became a lobbyist, co-founding the firm of Oldaker, Biden & Belair. According to Adam Entous of The New Yorker, Biden and his father established a relationship in which "Biden wouldn't ask Hunter about his lobbying clients, and Hunter wouldn't tell his father about them."

Hunter Biden was appointed to a five-year term on the board of directors of Amtrak by President George W. Bush in 2006. Biden was the board's vice chairman from July 2006 until 2009, was replaced as vice chairman in January 2010, and resigned from the board in February, shortly after his father became vice president. Biden said during his father's vice-presidential campaign that it was time for his lobbying activities to end.

Investor and lobbyist

In 2006, Biden and his uncle James Biden purchased international hedge fund Paradigm Global Advisors; Hunter was interim CEO of the fund for five years, until 2011. In September 2008, Biden launched a consultancy company named Seneca Global Advisors that offered to help companies expand into foreign markets. Biden was a partner in investment vehicles that included the name "Seneca" to denote his participation. In 2009, he, Devon Archer, and Christopher Heinz founded the investment and advisory firm Rosemont Seneca Partners. He also co-founded venture capital firm Eudora Global. He held the position of counsel in the law firm Boies Schiller Flexner LLP in 2014. Biden was on the board of directors of World Food Program USA, a 501(c)(3) charity based in Washington, D.C. that supports the work of the UN World Food Programme from 2011 to 2017; he served as board chairman from 2011 to 2015.

A detailed analysis of Hunter Biden's hard drive by NBC News showed that Biden and his firm were paid $11 million from 2013 to 2018.

Several bank accounts linked to Hunter Biden have received $3.8 million in payments from CEFC China Energy, an oil and gas company with links to the Chinese Communist Party.

BHR Partners

From 2013 to 2020, Biden served as a member of the board of the China-based private equity fund BHR Partners, of which he acquired a 10% stake in 2017 at a discount. The founders of BHR Partners included Biden's Rosemont Seneca Partners investment firm (20% equity), along with US-based Thornton Group LLC (10% equity) and two asset managers registered in China. The Chinese-registered asset managers are the Bank of China (via BOC International Holdings-backed Bohai Industrial Investment Fund Management) and Deutsche Bank-backed Harvest Fund Management.

In September 2019, while Trump was accusing Hunter Biden of malfeasance in Ukraine, he also falsely claimed that Biden "walk[ed] out of China with $1.5 billion in a fund" and earned "millions" of dollars from the BHR deal. Trump publicly called upon China to investigate Hunter Biden's business activities there while his father was vice president. Hunter Biden announced on October 13, 2019, his resignation from the board of directors for BHR Partners, effective at the end of the month, citing "the barrage of false charges" by then-U.S. President Trump. According to his lawyer, Biden had "not received any compensation for being on BHR's board of directors" nor had he received any return on his equity share in BHR. Biden's lawyer George Mesires told The Washington Post that BHR Partners had been "capitalized from various sources with a total of 30 million RMB [Chinese Renminbi], or about $4.2 million, not $1.5 billion". Chinese records showed Biden was no longer on BHR's board by April 2020. Biden's attorney said in November 2021 that his client no longer held any direct or indirect interest in BHR.

The BHR Partners fund invests Chinese venture capital into tech startups like an early-stage investment in Chinese car hailing app DiDi and cross-border acquisitions in automotive and mining, such as the purchase of a stake in Democratic Republic of Congo copper and cobalt producer Tenke Fungurume Mining. The New York Times reported that BHR Partners helped finance a coal-mining company in Australia that was controlled by a Chinese state-owned enterprise, assisted a subsidiary of a Chinese defense company in acquiring an auto parts manufacturer in Michigan, and helped facilitate a Chinese firm's  purchase of one of the world's richest cobalt mines in Democratic Republic of Congo. A former BHR board member told the Times that Biden and the other American BHR founders were not involved in the mine deal.

Burisma Holdings

Biden joined the board of Burisma Holdings owned by Ukrainian oligarch and former politician Mykola Zlochevsky, who was facing a money laundering investigation just after the Ukrainian revolution, in April 2014. Biden was hired to help Burisma with corporate governance best practices, while still an attorney with Boies Schiller Flexner, and a consulting firm in which Biden is a partner was also retained by Burisma. Christopher Heinz, John Kerry's stepson, opposed his partners Devon Archer and Hunter Biden joining the board in 2014 due to the reputational risk. Biden served on the board of Burisma until his term expired in April 2019, receiving compensation of up to $50,000 per month in some months. Because Joe Biden played a major role in U.S. policy towards Ukraine, some Ukrainian anti-corruption advocates and Obama administration officials expressed concern that Hunter Biden having joined the board could create the appearance of a conflict of interest and undermine Joe Biden's anti-corruption work in Ukraine. While serving as vice president, Joe Biden joined other Western leaders in encouraging the government of Ukraine to fire the country's top prosecutor Viktor Shokin, who was widely criticized for blocking corruption investigations. The Ukrainian parliament voted to remove Shokin in March 2016.

Former President Donald Trump and his personal lawyer Rudy Giuliani claimed in 2019, without evidence, that Joe Biden had sought the dismissal of Shokin in order to protect his son and Burisma Holdings. Actually, it was the official policy of the United States and the European Union to seek Shokin's removal. There has also been no evidence produced of wrongdoing by Hunter Biden in Ukraine. The Ukrainian anti-corruption investigation agency stated in September 2019 that its current investigation of Burisma was restricted solely to investigating the period from 2010 to 2012, before Hunter Biden joined Burisma in 2014. Shokin, in May 2019, claimed that he was fired because he had been actively investigating Burisma, but U.S. and Ukrainian officials have stated that the investigation into Burisma was dormant at the time of Shokin's dismissal. Ukrainian and United States State Department sources note that Shokin was fired for failing to address corruption, including within his office.

In July 2019, Trump ordered the freezing of $391 million in military aid shortly before a telephone conversation with Ukrainian President Volodymyr Zelenskyy in which Trump asked Zelenskyy to initiate an investigation of the Bidens. Trump falsely told Zelenskyy that "[Joe] Biden went around bragging that he stopped the prosecution" of his son; Joe Biden did not stop any prosecution, did not brag about doing so, and there is no evidence his son was ever under investigation. The United States House of Representatives initiated a formal impeachment inquiry on September 24, 2019, against Trump on the grounds that he may have sought to use U.S. foreign aid and the Ukrainian government to damage Joe Biden's 2020 presidential campaign. Ukrainian prosecutor general Yuriy Lutsenko said in May 2019 that Hunter Biden had not violated Ukrainian law. After Lutsenko was replaced by Ruslan Riaboshapka as prosecutor general, Lutsenko and Riaboshapka said in September and October 2019 respectively that they had seen no evidence of wrongdoing by Hunter Biden.

During 2019 and into 2020, Republican senators Ron Johnson and Chuck Grassley investigated Hunter Biden's involvement with Burisma, as well as allegations that Democrats colluded with the Ukrainian government to interfere in the 2016 election. The chairman of the Senate Intelligence Committee Republican senator Richard Burr privately expressed concerns to the senators that their inquiries could assist efforts by Russian intelligence to spread disinformation to disrupt American domestic affairs. American intelligence officials briefed senators in late 2019 about Russian efforts to frame Ukraine for 2016 election interference. Johnson said he would release findings in spring 2020, as Democrats would be selecting their 2020 presidential nominee, but instead ramped up the investigation at Trump's urging in May 2020, after it became clear that Joe Biden would be the nominee. Trump tweeted a press report about the investigations, later stating that he would make allegations of corruption by the Bidens a central theme of his re-election campaign. Johnson decided in March 2020 against issuing a subpoena for former Ukrainian official Andrii Telizhenko, a Giuliani associate who had made appearances on the pro-Trump cable channel One America News, after the FBI briefed him about concerns Telizhenko could be spreading Russian disinformation. The State Department revoked Telizhenko's visa in October 2020, and CNN reported the American government was considering sanctioning him as a Russian agent. CNN reported that Vladislav Davidzon, the editor of Ukrainian magazine The Odessa Review, told CNN that in 2018 Telizhenko offered him money to lobby Republican senators in support of pro-Russian television stations in Ukraine. When Johnson released the final report on the investigation, it contained no evidence that Joe Biden had pushed for Shokin's removal in order to benefit Hunter or Burisma.

In June 2020, former Ukrainian prosecutor general Ruslan Riaboshapka stated that an audit of thousands of old case files he had ordered in October 2019 had found no wrongdoing by Hunter Biden. Riaboshapka was described by Zelenskyy as "100 percent my person" during the July 2019 call in which Trump asked him to investigate Biden.

Ukrainian lawmaker Andrii Derkach, an associate of Rudy Giuliani with links to Russian intelligence, released in May 2020 alleged snippets of recordings of Joe Biden speaking with Ukrainian president Petro Poroshenko during the years Hunter Biden worked for Burisma. The recordings, which were not verified as authentic and appeared heavily edited, depicted Biden linking loan guarantees for Ukraine to the ouster of the country's prosecutor general. The recordings did not provide evidence to support the ongoing conspiracy theory that Biden wanted the prosecutor fired to protect his son. Poroshenko denied in June 2020 that Joe Biden ever approached him about Burisma. The United States Department of the Treasury sanctioned Derkach in September 2020, stating he "has been an active Russian agent for over a decade, maintaining close connections with the Russian Intelligence Services". The Treasury Department added Derkach "waged a covert influence campaign centered on cultivating false and unsubstantiated narratives concerning U.S. officials in the upcoming 2020 Presidential Election" including by the release of "edited audio tapes and other unsupported information with the intent to discredit U.S. officials". Close associates of Derkach were also sanctioned by the Treasury Department in January 2021. United States intelligence community analysis released in March 2021 found that Derkach was among proxies of Russian intelligence who promoted and laundered misleading or unsubstantiated narratives about Biden "to US media organizations, US officials, and prominent US individuals, including some close to former President Trump and his administration".

Two Republicans on a Senate investigation committee in 2020 claimed that Russian businessperson Yelena Baturina, the wife of former Moscow mayor Yury Luzhkov, wire-transferred $3.5 million in 2014 to Rosemont Seneca Thornton, of which Biden had previously been a partner. The Washington Post reported in April 2022 that the partners of Rosemont Seneca Thornton had agreed to dissolve the organization before the 2014 wire transfer, though it continued to be operated by Devin Archer to facilitate real estate transactions for eastern and central Asia investors, while Biden was uninvolved. Archer received the $3.5 million wire from Baturina to purchase property in Brooklyn, New York. The Senate report cited unspecified confidential documents and gave no evidence that Biden personally accepted the funds. Biden's attorney denied the report, saying Biden had no financial relationship with the woman and no stake in the partnership that received the money, nor did he co-found the partnership. However, Trump's White House spokeswoman Alyssa Farah repeated the claim, and in a press conference Trump repeatedly asserted that Biden received millions of dollars from the former mayor's wife.

Investigations

In December 2020, Biden made a public announcement via his attorney that his tax affairs are under federal criminal investigation. The New York Times and CNN, citing sources familiar with the investigation, described the investigation as having started in late 2018 and being related to potential violations of tax and money laundering laws and his business dealings in foreign countries, principally China. The Wall Street Journal reported that Biden had provided legal and consulting services that generated foreign-earned income, citing a Senate Republicans' report that says millions of dollars in wire transfers from entities linked to Chinese energy tycoon Ye Jianming were paying for such services. The New York Times reported that according to people familiar with the inquiry, FBI investigators had been unable to establish sufficient evidence for a prosecution of potential money laundering crimes, including after the seizure of a laptop purportedly belonging to Biden, and so the investigation progressed onto tax issues. The Times reported in May 2022 that Hollywood attorney and writer Kevin Morris, who has become an influential adviser/confidant and now financier to Biden, lent him more than $2 million to pay back taxes and support his family.

The New York Times reported in March 2022 that since 2018 Biden and possibly others had been under investigation by federal prosecutors in Delaware, with a grand jury convened to subpoena and hear evidence. The investigation examined payments and gifts Biden or his associates had received from foreign interests and whether Biden had violated the law by not registering as a lobbyist under the Foreign Agents Registration Act (FARA). The Times reported it had acquired emails that were authenticated by people familiar with them and the investigation that appeared to come from a laptop belonging to Biden. One April 2014 email, written by Biden to his business partner as their work with Burisma was about to begin, noted that his father, then the vice president who would soon visit Kyiv, should "be characterized as part of our advice and thinking—but what he will say and do is out of our hands." The email also stated that Burisma officials "need to know in no uncertain terms that we will not and cannot intervene directly with domestic policymakers, and that we need to abide by FARA and any other U.S. laws in the strictest sense across the board." Biden wrote that his father's visit "could be a really good thing or it could end up creating too great an expectation. We need to temper expectations regarding that visit." He also wrote that his employer, the law firm Boies Schiller Flexner, could help Burisma through "direct discussions at state, energy and NSC." Other emails showed Biden and his business partner discussing inviting foreign business associates, including a Burisma executive, to attend an April 2015 dinner in Washington, where the vice president would stop by.

A July 2022 report from CNN authenticated emails which showed that Biden was struggling with large debt and overdue tax bills.

In October 2022, The Washington Post reported that federal agents had determined months ago that they had assembled enough evidence for a viable criminal case against Biden to charge him with crimes related to making false declarations during a gun purchase, as well as tax-related crimes. The next step is for Delaware U.S. Attorney David C. Weiss to decide on whether to file such charges.

Federal investigators have also been examining the lobbying firm Blue Star Strategies, which Burisma retained while Biden sat on its board, for possible illegal lobbying of American officials. There was no indication Biden was a subject of the investigation. Blue Star employees said in Senate testimony that Biden was included in emails about the firm's work but that he was not particularly involved. One of the firm's co-founders said Biden did not direct its work. Blue Star's work came after Burisma's owner was criticized by the United States State Department, and the firm's founders testified the firm had merely approached officials to determine the government's views of Burisma.

Laptop controversy 

On October 14, 2020, twenty days prior to the 2020 United States presidential election, the New York Post published an article, with the involvement of Donald Trump's personal attorney Rudy Giuliani and former chief strategist Steve Bannon, about a laptop computer of unknown origin and chain of custody that appeared to belong to Hunter Biden, who allegedly left it for repairs at a Wilmington, Delaware computer shop owned by John Paul Mac Isaac, but never retrieved it. The laptop contained an email describing what the New York Post characterized as a "meeting" between Joe Biden and Vadym Pozharskyi, a Burisma advisor, in 2015, though that characterization was disputed by witnesses. The email between Hunter Biden and Pozharskyi would later be authenticated.

The article's veracity was strongly questioned by most mainstream media outlets, analysts and intelligence officials, due to the unknown chain of custody of the laptop and its contents, and suspicion that it may have been part of a Russian disinformation campaign. As of 2022, Vox reported that no evidence had ever emerged "that the laptop's leak was a Russian plot." In March 2022, The New York Times reported that they found emails "from a cache of files that appears to have come from a laptop abandoned by Mr. Biden in a Delaware repair shop." Also in March, The Washington Post reported that two security experts confirmed the veracity of thousands of emails purportedly from Hunter Biden's laptop. However, "The vast majority of the data—and most of the nearly 129,000 emails it contained—could not be verified by either of the two security experts who reviewed the data for The Post." Among the emails that The Washington Post was able to authenticate was the Pozharskyi email that formed the basis of the New York Post's original article. In May 2022, NBC News published an analysis of a copy of the hard drive they received from Giuliani and documents released by Republicans on two Senate committees. The analysis found that Biden's firm took in $11 million from 2013 to 2018 and spent the money quickly. The analysis also found that few of Biden's deals ever came to fruition.

In November 2022, CBS News published a forensic analysis they had commissioned of a clean "exact copy" of the laptop data, later provided by the shop owner to federal investigators, that predated versions widely circulated by Republican operatives to attack then-candidate Joe Biden before the 2020 presidential election. The cyber investigators found "no evidence that the user data had been modified, fabricated or tampered with". The chief technology officer of Computer Forensics Services said, "I have no doubt in my mind that this data was created by Hunter Biden, and that it came from a computer under Mr. Biden's control".

In January 2023, an anonymous Twitter account posted a rental application found on the laptop, leading to a false claim that in 2018 Hunter Biden had paid $49,910 in monthly rent for his father's Delaware residence where classified documents had been found. The false allegation quickly spread across conservative media. A Breitbart story that speculated Hunter Biden may have had access to classified documents was retweeted by House Republican Conference chair Elise Stefanik who added that "Joe Biden and the Biden Crime Family are corrupt and significant threats to national security. Our Republican House Majority will hold them accountable." James Comer, chair of the House Oversight Committee that was investigating the Biden family, suggested it was evidence that Hunter Biden may have been funneling foreign money to his father. The document actually showed quarterly rental payments for office space at the House of Sweden in Washington, D.C. On his Fox News program, host Tucker Carlson echoed Comer's false suggestion of Hunter Biden malfeasance; days later Hunter Biden's attorneys wrote Carlson and Fox News demanding they correct the falsehood or risk a defamation lawsuit.

In February 2023, Biden attorneys wrote to the Justice Department National Security Division asking they criminally investigate "individuals for whom there is considerable reason to believe violated various federal laws in accessing, copying, manipulating, and/or disseminating Mr. Biden's personal computer data." A similar letter was sent to the Attorney General of Delaware. The letters named Giuliani, Bannon, Mac Issac, and others.

Work as an artist 
In February 2020, The New York Times reported that Biden had been painting as an "undiscovered artist" in his Hollywood Hills home. The report also displayed some of his paintings, including "Untitled #4 (a study in ink)" and "Untitled #3 (a signed work)". Biden's art dealer, Georges Bergès, hosted a private viewing for Biden in Los Angeles in Fall 2021, followed by an exhibition in New York. Biden's paintings were put up for sale for as much as $500,000 per painting. This provoked conflict of interest concerns as well as concerns about a lack of transparency.

Naval career

Biden's application for a position in the U.S. Navy Reserve was approved in May 2013. At age 43, Biden was accepted as part of a program that allows a limited number of applicants with desirable skills to receive commissions and serve in staff positions. Biden received an age-related waiver and a waiver due to a past drug-related incident; he was sworn in as a direct commission officer. Joe Biden administered his commissioning oath in a White House ceremony.

The following month, Biden tested positive for cocaine during a urinalysis test and was subsequently discharged administratively. Biden attributed the result to smoking cigarettes he had accepted from other smokers, claiming the cigarettes were laced with cocaine. He chose not to appeal the matter as it was unlikely that the panel would believe his explanation given his history with drugs and also due to the likelihood of news leaking to the press; it was ultimately revealed to The Wall Street Journal by a Navy official who provided the information.

Personal life

Relationships

Biden married Kathleen Buhle in 1993. They have three daughters: Naomi, Finnegan, and Maisy. The couple divorced in 2017. Biden began a relationship with Hallie Olivere Biden, widow of his brother Beau, in 2016. The relationship ended by 2019.

Biden is also the father of a daughter born in August 2018 to Lunden Alexis Roberts, who gave birth in Arkansas. Lunden Roberts used to live in Washington DC and worked for Biden. Biden initially denied paternity of the child, but a DNA test, conducted as part of a paternity suit filed in May 2019 by Roberts, confirmed paternity. The lawsuit was settled in March 2020 for an undisclosed amount. Hunter Biden filed a motion in September 2022 to reopen the case and reduce his child support payments, a request opposed by Roberts. He reportedly has no contact with the girl. Roberts responded by petitioning the Arkansas court to change the child’s surname to Biden, so that his daughter might benefit from associations with Biden’s family.

Biden married South African filmmaker Melissa Cohen in May 2019, within a week after first meeting her. Their son, Beau, was born in March 2020 in Los Angeles.

Drug and alcohol abuse
Biden has had a life-long struggle with drug and alcohol abuse and detailed his struggles in his memoir Beautiful Things. He believes his addiction can be linked back to trauma from the 1972 motor vehicle accident that killed his mother and sister. Over the past two decades, Biden has been in and out of rehabilitation, with long periods of sobriety followed by relapses. Following the death of his brother Beau, his addiction escalated, and he claims to have been "smoking crack every 15 minutes." A detailed analysis of Hunter Biden's hard drive by NBC News showed that Biden and his firm were paid $11 million from 2013 to 2018, and the funds fueled his addiction. In his autobiography Beautiful Things, he said that the money from Burisma "turned into a major enabler during my steepest skid into addiction" and "hounded me to spend recklessly, dangerously, destructively. Humiliatingly. So I did." In early 2019, he had an intervention.

Memoir 
Biden released a memoir discussing the trauma of the accident that claimed the lives of his mother and sister and his later addiction struggles, titled Beautiful Things on April 6, 2021. In The New York Times, reviewer Elisabeth Egan described the book as "equal parts family saga, grief narrative and addict's howl."

References

External links

 
1970 births
21st-century American lawyers
21st-century American memoirists
American people of English descent
American people of French descent
American people of Irish descent
Amtrak people
Hunter
Boies Schiller Flexner people
Catholics from Delaware
Children of presidents of the United States
Children of vice presidents of the United States
Delaware Democrats
Georgetown College (Georgetown University) alumni
Lawyers from Washington, D.C.
Living people
People from Wilmington, Delaware
People with traumatic brain injuries
Trump–Ukraine scandal
United States Navy officers
United States Navy reservists
Yale Law School alumni